is a former Japanese football player.

Club statistics

References

External links

j-league

1982 births
Living people
Hosei University alumni
Association football people from Kagoshima Prefecture
Japanese footballers
J2 League players
Japan Football League players
Kataller Toyama players
Association football midfielders